Uwe Kekeritz (born 9 October 1953) is a German politician of Alliance 90/The Greens who served as a member of the Bundestag from the state of Bavaria from 2009 until 2021.

Early life and career 
After completing his vocational baccalaureate, Kekeritz went to London, where he initially studied English as a foreign language. After his return to Germany, he stayed in Nuremberg and in 1987 he graduated from the Faculty of Economics and Social Sciences at the University of Erlangen-Nuremberg with a degree in Economics.

From 1982 to 1988 Kekeritz worked as an independent consultant for small entrepreneurs and start-ups. In 1988 he moved with his family to Cameroon for two years, where he taught mathematics and English at a secondary school via the German Development Service (DED). He continued his teaching activities in Germany.

Political career 
Kekeritz first became a member of the Bundestag in the 2009 German federal election. He was a member of the Committee on Economic Cooperation and Development and spokesman for his group on development policy.

In addition to his committee assignments, Kekeritz served as chairman of the German Parliamentary Friendship Group for Relations with the Western African States.

He lost his seat in the 2021 German federal election.

Other activities 
 German Institute for Development Evaluation (DEval), Member of the Advisory Board (–2021)
 German Foundation for World Population (DSW), Member of the Parliamentary Advisory Board (–2021)
 Heinrich Böll Foundation, Member of the North/South Advisory Board

References

External links 

  
 Bundestag biography 
 

 

1953 births
Living people
Members of the Bundestag for Bavaria
Members of the Bundestag 2017–2021
Members of the Bundestag 2013–2017
Members of the Bundestag 2009–2013
Members of the Bundestag for Alliance 90/The Greens
People from Oberallgäu
University of Erlangen-Nuremberg alumni